The Institute on Taxation and Economic Policy (ITEP) is a non-profit, non-partisan think tank that works on state and federal tax policy issues. ITEP was founded in 1980, and is a 501(c)(3) tax-exempt organization. ITEP describes its mission as striving to "keep policymakers and the public informed of the effects of current and proposed tax policies on tax fairness, government budgets and sound economic policy."

Publications
ITEP's flagship publication is its "Who Pays?" report. The report was originally released in 1996, and has since been updated in 2003, 2009, 2013, 2015 and 2018. The 2018 report includes tax changes enacted through September 10, 2018, at 2015 income levels. "Who Pays?" analyzes the distribution, by income level, of state and local taxes in all 50 states, as well as in the District of Columbia. Its main finding is that: "the vast majority of state and local tax systems are fundamentally unfair. An overreliance on consumption taxes and the absence of a progressive personal income tax in many states neutralizes whatever benefits the working poor receive from refundable low-income tax credits." The majority of the data contained in this report is produced using the ITEP Microsimulation Tax Model.

Other major reports released by ITEP include "90 Reasons We Need State Corporate Tax Reform", which examines the effective state corporate income tax rates paid by large and profitable companies. "Building a Better Gas Tax" measures the impact of construction cost inflation in preventing most state gasoline taxes from providing a sustainable source of transportation revenue. "A Capital Idea" examines the revenue and fairness implications of state tax breaks for capital gains income, and "Writing Off Tax Giveaways" does the same for itemized deductions. ITEP also reports on "Undocumented Immigrants' State and Local Tax Contribution" made by nearly 11 million undocumented immigrants residing currently in the United States. Many of ITEP's reports deal with issues or proposals that are relevant to only a single state – often focusing on proposed tax changes or reforms, for example, "The ITEP Guide to Fair State and Local Taxes".<ref>The ITEP Guide to Fair State and Local Taxes. Institute on Taxation and Economic Policy.</ref>

ITEP has released a series of reports criticizing studies by Arthur Laffer about the economic impact of lowering or eliminating state personal income taxes and estate taxes.

Funders
ITEP lists a number of foundations among its funders, including the Annie E. Casey Foundation, the Ford Foundation, and the New York Community Trust. ITEP also accepts individual donations.

Political stance
ITEP's quantitative analyses are utilized by observers from across the political spectrum and by analysts within government. ITEP, as well as the associated Citizens for Tax Justice, has been characterized as liberal.

The ITEP Microsimulation Tax Model

Many of ITEP's analyses rely on the ITEP Microsimulation Tax Model. The ITEP model is a computer program capable of estimating the revenue yield and distribution of federal, state, and local taxes, as well as proposed changes to those taxes.

According to ITEP, its model "relies on one of the largest databases of tax returns and supplementary data in existence, encompassing close to three quarters of a million records." Three similar microsimulation models are used by the Joint Committee on Taxation, the U.S. Treasury Department, and the Congressional Budget Office. The ITEP model, however, stands apart from each of these in that it adds state-by-state estimating capabilities. The Urban-Brookings Tax Policy Center and the Tax Foundation have also built their own tax models.

Tax haven research

An ITEP report which attracts worldwide media attention is the Offshore Shell Games: The Use of Offshore Tax Havens by Fortune 500 Companies report.  ITEP jointly fund the report with the U.S. Public Interest Research Group ("PRIG"), Education Fund. The report adopts a purely quantitative approach and calculates the scale of involvement by leading U.S. multinationals with tax havens by conducting analysis on their SEC 10-K and 10-Q filings.  The latest report was in 2017 and it ranks tax havens by two different type of quantitative calculations, based on 2012-2015 10-K and 10-Q filings:

ITEP's ranking of tax havens matches with other academic rankings of tax havens, for example:  

Note that the above two academic studies example global corporate activity, and not just Fortune 500 Companies.  However, as noted in the academic literature, most corporate tax avoidance and BEPS strategies are executed by U.S. multinationals ("MNCs"), and the BEPS strategies used by all global MNCs have similarities, thus using similar havens.

ITEP 2017 tax haven list (by quantum of connections)

The ten largest tax havens from the ITEP 2017 report, ranked by the percentage of Fortune 500 Companies with subsidiaries in the tax haven:

(*) Identified as one of the largest 10 corporate tax havens by Gabriel Zucman in 2018 (Cayman and the British Virgin Islands appear as Caribbean).
(†) Identified as one of the largest 5 Conduits by CORPNET in 2017.
(‡) Identified as one of the largest 5 Sinks by CORPNET in 2017.
(Δ) Identified on the first OECD 2000 list of 35 tax havens (the OECD list only contained Trinidad & Tobago by 2017).

ITEP 2017 tax haven list (by quantum of profits)

The ten largest tax havens from the ITEP 2017 report, ranked by the profits booked by Fortune 500 Companies in the tax haven:

(*) Identified as one of the largest 10 corporate tax havens by Gabriel Zucman in 2018 (Cayman and the British Virgin Islands appear as Caribbean'').
(†) Identified as one of the largest 5 Conduits by CORPNET in 2017.
(‡) Identified as one of the largest 5 Sinks by CORPNET in 2017.
(Δ) Identified on the first OECD 2000 list of 35 tax havens (the OECD list only contained Trinidad & Tobago by 2017).

See also
Center for American Progress
Center on Budget and Policy Priorities
Conduit and Sink OFCs
Corporate tax havens
Economic Policy Institute
Ireland as a tax haven
Tax Foundation
Tax Policy Center

References

External links

Who Pays report, sixth edition
Offshore Shell Games, 2017

Political and economic think tanks in the United States
Think tanks based in Washington, D.C.
Non-profit organizations based in Washington, D.C.
Nonpartisan organizations in the United States
Tax avoidance
Corporate tax avoidance
Global issues
501(c)(3) organizations